Cristina Elena Garcia known as Cuci Amador is an electro funk singer.

Biography 
Cristina Elena Garcia was born in San Juan Puerto Rico on November 10, 1979 of Cuban parents. She is the singer of the musical group Afrobeta.

Music 
"That Thing" Single available on iTunes, includes "That Thing" and "Nighttime"

Collaborations 
 Co-writer and vocalist on Grammy award winning artist, Calle 13's most recent album "Los De Atras Vienen Conmigo" on the second single named "Electro Movimiento".
 Also appears in the recently released video for "Electro Movimiento"
 Also appeared on "2gether 4ever" on fellow Miami artist, Jose El Rey's first album, "A Little Strong".
 Also appeared as the female singer in the "We are here for you" commercials from Florida Blue Insurance.

References

External links 
 Official band Website

1979 births
Living people
Singers from San Juan, Puerto Rico
21st-century Puerto Rican women singers